The Old U.S. Post Office in Bend, Oregon, is a post office building that was built in 1932.  It was listed on the National Register of Historic Places in 1985.

According to its NRHP nomination, "the Post Office is a noteworthy example in Oregon of Stripped Classical architecture in which historical ornament is subordinated to a modernistic emphasis of geometric volume."

See also
National Register of Historic Places in Deschutes County, Oregon

References

External links

, National Register of Historic Places cover documentation

National Register of Historic Places in Bend, Oregon
Significant US Post Offices in Oregon 1900-1941 TR
Government buildings completed in 1932
Neoclassical architecture in Oregon
1932 establishments in Oregon